Tetyana Shchurenko (born 26 February 1976, in Dnipropetrovsk) is a retired Ukrainian triple jumper. She represented her nation Ukraine in the triple jump at the 2004 Summer Olympics, and also set a personal best of 14.22 metres from the national athletics meet in Kyiv.

Shchurenko qualified for the Ukrainian squad, along with teammate Olena Hovorova, in the women's triple jump at the 2004 Summer Olympics in Athens. Two months before the Games, she jumped 14.22 metres to register her own personal best and an Olympic A-standard at the national athletics meet in Kyiv. During the prelims, Shchurenko got off to a rough start with an immediate foul, but spanned a mediocre 13.55-metre leap on her third attempt to secure a thirtieth spot from a roster of thirty-three athletes, failing to advance further to the final round.

References

External links

1976 births
Living people
Ukrainian female triple jumpers
Olympic athletes of Ukraine
Athletes (track and field) at the 2004 Summer Olympics
Sportspeople from Dnipro